Staad railway station is a railway station in Thal, in the Swiss canton of St. Gallen. It is an intermediate stop on the Chur–Rorschach line.

Services 
Staad is served by three services of the St. Gallen S-Bahn:

 : hourly service between Nesslau-Neu St. Johann and Altstätten SG
 : hourly service via Sargans (circular operation).
 : hourly service between Weinfelden and St. Margrethen.

References

External links 
 
 

Railway stations in the canton of St. Gallen
Swiss Federal Railways stations